Tselina is an umbrella term for underdeveloped, scarcely populated high-fertility lands.  

Tselina may also refer to:

Places
Tselina, Bulgaria, a populated place in Chirpan Municipality of Stara Zagora Province, Bulgaria
Tselina, Russia, a rural locality (a settlement) in Tselinsky District of Rostov Oblast, Russia
Tselinograd, a former name of Nur-Sultan - the present capital city of Kazakhstan.

Other uses
Virgin Lands campaign, 1953–1965 Soviet project to boost agriculture
Tselina (satellite), a Russian satellite used for military space-based radio surveillance system
2111 Tselina, a main-belt asteroid

See also
 Celina (disambiguation)